Legg Mason Tower is a 24-story glass high-rise located at 100 International Drive in Baltimore's Harbor East development. It was designed by Beatty Harvey Coco Architects with HKS Architects, and is situated at the edge of the city's Inner Harbor. This Class-A office building serves as the new headquarters for asset management firm Legg Mason, which moved from what was the Legg Mason Building at 100 Light Street.

It is also known as the home campus of the Johns Hopkins Carey Business School. The building is part of a mixed-use development with its neighbor, the Four Seasons Hotel, which was completed and opened in 2011. It is Pre-Certified Silver under the LEED Core and Shell Program, and was one of six developments recognized by the Urban Land Institute Wavemaker Award in 2009.

See also
List of tallest buildings in Baltimore

References

External links
Legg Mason Official Website

Inner Harbor East, Baltimore
Skyscraper office buildings in Baltimore
Office buildings completed in 2009
Headquarters in the United States